The 2014–15 USHL season is the 36th season of the United States Hockey League as an all-junior league. The regular season ran from September 26, 2014, to April 11, 2015. The regular season champion Youngstown Phantoms were awarded the Anderson Cup. The playoff champion Sioux Falls Stampede captured the Clark Cup.

Regular season
Note: GP = Games played; W = Wins; L = Losses; OTL = Overtime losses; PTS = Points; GF = Goals for; GA = Goals against; PIM = Penalties in Minutesx = clinched playoff berth; y = clinched conference title; z = clinched regular season title

Eastern Conference

Western Conference

Post Season Awards

All-USHL First Team

All-USHL Second Team

All-USHL Third Team

All Rookie First Team

All Rookie Second Team

Clark Cup Playoffs

References

External links
 Official website of the United States Hockey League

United States Hockey League seasons
Ushl